Kalo Pothi: The Black Hen is a 2015 Nepali drama film directed by Min Bahadur Bham and produced by Anna Katchko, Tsering Rhitar Sherpa, Min Bahadur Bham, Debaki Rai, Catherine Dussart and Anup Thapa.

The story takes place in Mugu, a district in north-west Nepal in 2001 during the Nepalese civil war (1996–2006). It is the first Nepali film to be screened at the Venice Film Festival. It was selected as the Nepalese entry for the Best Foreign Language Film at the 89th Academy Awards but it was not nominated. It is also the highest grossing Nepali film in overseas and one of the highest-grossing films in Nepal.

Plot
The film is based on a journey embarked by two friends, Prakash and Kiran, belonging to different castes in search of a missing hen, unaware of the tyranny brought by the fragile ceasefire during the Nepalese civil war.

Cast
 Khadka Raj Nepali as Prakash
 Sukraj Rokaya as Kiran
 Jit Bahadur Malla as Prakash's father
 Benisha Hamal as Kiran's sister
 Hansa Khadka as Prakash's sister
 Nanda Prashad Khatri 
 Bipin Karki
 Praween Khatiwada

Reception
The film opened to generally positive reviews. Sophia Pande of Nepali Times wrote that the film is "an example of the transformation of Nepali cinema, the kind that chooses to portray stories with truth and heart, over melodrama and action". The Himalayan Times wrote in its review: "A mixture of tragedy and comedy, while portraying the brother-sister bond, friendship, caste-based discrimination and the then time of Maoist insurgency in the country, Kalo Pothi has been made with finesse". Clarence Tsui of The Hollywood Reporter wrote "Bolstered by stirring performances from his cast, Bham and his crew have produced an evocative piece about harsh lives unraveling in a war-torn, rustic land. Mixing moments of humor and tragedy, along with realism and the ethereal — the latter embodied in fantastic dream sequences illustrating Prakash’s suppressed feelings of grief and loss — Black Hen is an effective showcase of a promising filmmaker in flight".

Awards
 Best Film at Venice International Film Festival, Critics Week, 2015

See also
 List of submissions to the 89th Academy Awards for Best Foreign Language Film
 List of Nepalese submissions for the Academy Award for Best Foreign Language Film

References

External links
 

2015 films
2015 drama films
2010s Nepali-language films
Nepalese drama films
Nepalese Civil War films
Nepalese historical films
Films set in 2001